Helvidia is a monotypic genus of Sumatran comb-footed spiders containing the single species, Helvidia scabricula. It was first described by Tamerlan Thorell in 1890, and is found on Sumatra. Only males have ever been recorded.

See also
 List of Theridiidae species

References

Monotypic Araneomorphae genera
Spiders of Asia
Taxa named by Tamerlan Thorell
Theridiidae